Sviatopolk may refer to:

 Sviatopolk I of Kiev (c. 980 – 1019)
 Sviatopolk II of Kiev (1050–1113)

See also
Świętopełk (disambiguation) Polish version
Zwentibold German version
Svatopluk (disambiguation) Czech version 
Svätopluk (disambiguation) Slovak version
Svante Swedish version